The Sacred Land is a historical novel written by H.N. Turteltaub (a pseudonym of Harry Turtledove). It was first published in hardcover by Forge Books in December 2003, and in paperback by Tor Books in March 2005. The book was reissued under the author's real name as a trade paperback and ebook by Phoenix Pick in December 2014. It is the third book in the Hellenic Traders series.

Plot
The book concerns the continuing adventures of a pair of Greek traders from Rhodes. Sostratos, the more scholarly of the pair, visits Jerusalem, where he tries to learn more about the odd monotheists who live there. His cousin Menedemos, meanwhile, fulfills his usual role of paying more attention to profits than prophets and pays a great deal of attention to women (occasionally those married to other men).

Setting
The setting is the coast of Asia Minor, Cyprus, and Jerusalem and the surrounding area in the period of time about thirty years after the death of Alexander the Great. As in the other books in the series, persons and places are frequently given their Greek names rather than the English ones (Sokrates, Platon, etc.).

References

2003 American novels
Hellenic Traders novels
Novels set in ancient Greece
Forge Books books
Novels set in the 3rd century BC